Boško Bursać (22 August 1945 – 8 April 2020) was a Yugoslav professional footballer.

Club career
Born in Bosansko Grahovo, SR Bosnia and Herzegovina, then part of Yugoslavia, he started his career at Serbian side FK Proleter Zrenjanin. After only one season, he moved to HNK Rijeka where he was regarded as one of the best forwards and he remains the club's top scorer of all time. He was the club's top scorer for five years. After eight seasons with Rijeka, he spent 2 seasons with NK Zagreb before he continued his career abroad in the Netherlands with Vitesse Arnhem.

Death
Bursać died in Arnhem, Holland on 8 April 2020 at the age of 74.

References

External links
 Profile at Voetbal International 

1945 births
2020 deaths
People from Bosansko Grahovo
Serbs of Bosnia and Herzegovina
Association football forwards
Yugoslav footballers
FK Proleter Zrenjanin players
HNK Rijeka players
NK Zagreb players
SBV Vitesse players
Yugoslav First League players
Eredivisie players
Yugoslav expatriate footballers
Expatriate footballers in the Netherlands
Yugoslav expatriate sportspeople in the Netherlands